Axium Foods, Inc., a division of McCleary, Inc., is a manufacturer of corn-based snack products, including plain and flavored tortilla chips, corn chips, puffed cheese snacks, and crunchy cheese snacks.

Headquartered in South Beloit, IL, it is a private label snack food manufacturer and the maker of Pajeda's snacks.

History
Eugene "Mac" McCleary graduated with a degree in chemical engineering from Michigan State University class of 1942. He enlisted in the Navy during World War II and was stationed in Beloit, WI, where he was head of government inspection for submarine engines being built at Fairbanks Morse.

After the war, Mac was offered a job at Adams Corporation, a fledgling company formed to manufacture and distribute the Korn Kurl, a new snack food that was invented on a local dairy farm. Mac worked with Adams Corporation for 15 years as their Director of Manufacturing and was instrumental in the development of continuous production of this new snack food.

Mac started his own private label snack food company on November 22, 1960, and called it McCleary Industries, which would later be renamed to  McCleary, Inc. and then Axium Foods, Inc.

In the year 2000, Axium Foods created Pajeda's, its first branded line of tortilla chips and snacks. In 2010, Pajeda's introduced Fiesta Crunch, a line of tortilla chips and potato poppers.

In November 2010, Axium Foods celebrated 50 years in business. Mac McCleary died in 2007, but the company remains family-owned and operated.

In March 2012, Axium Foods introduced the brand Mystic Harvest, including tortilla chips made with purple corn.

Environmental sustainability
Axium Foods has a full wastewater treatment plant that includes an anaerobic digester. That process creates methane gas, and while the company currently flares that gas, it is exploring ways to recapture it and/or generate electricity with it. The company also takes any dry waste created from producing its corn-based snacks and sells it as cattle feed to a local farmer, keeping the dry waste out of landfills. Raw materials for their snacks, primarily corn and flavorings, come from local farmers and ingredient companies.

Products

Pajeda's Tortilla Chips
Pajeda's Puffed Cheese and Crunchy Cheese snacks
Pajeda's Party Mix
Pajeda's Corn Chips
Pajeda's Onion Rings

See also

List of food companies

References

External links
Axium Foods Official Website  
Pajeda's Website

Brand name snack foods
Food and drink companies of the United States
Companies based in Winnebago County, Illinois
Privately held companies based in Illinois